Maria Luiza Viotti (born on  in Belo Horizonte, Brazil) is the Chef de Cabinet to UN Secretary General António Guterres. Viotti was the Ambassador of Brazil to Germany from 2013 until 2016, Permanent Representative of Brazil to the United Nations from 2007 until 2013, and President of the United Nations Security Council for the month of February 2011. She is married to Eduardo Baumgratz Viotti and has a son.

Education
Viotti has a bachelor's degree in economics from the University of Brasilia, which she received in 1979. She has a post-graduate degree in the same subject, which she completed in 1981, from the same university. She attended the Rio Branco Institute, the Brazilian diplomatic academy.

Diplomatic career
Viotti joined the Brazilian Foreign Service in 1976. She held several positions within the Ministry of External Relations, including:
Director-General of the Department of International Organizations;
Director-General of the Department of Human Rights and Social Affairs;
Secretary-General of the South America Division;
Executive Coordinator in the cabinet of the Minister of External Relations.

Overseas assignments
Viotti served as Counselor at the Brazilian Embassy in La Paz, Bolivia, from 1993 to 1995, and from 1985 to 1989, Viotti served as a First Secretary at the Brazilian Mission to the United Nations, when she started to specialize in the UN System.

In 1999, Viotti returned to the Brazilian Mission to the United Nations as a Minister-Counselor. Viotti was the Vice-Chairperson of the Preparatory Committee for the Johannesburg World Summit on Sustainable Development and led Brazil's delegation to the negotiations in preparation for the International Conference on Financing for Development. She was also a member of the Economic and Social Council’s Ad Hoc Group on Guinea-Bissau.

In 2005, Viotti assumed the post of Chargé d'affaires of Brazil to the United Nations, and she was appointed Permanent Representative of Brazil to the United Nations by President Luiz Inácio Lula da Silva on 5 January 2007. Viotti presented her credentials to UN Secretary-General Ban Ki-moon on 25 July 2007. Viotti was the President of the United Nations Security Council for the month of February 2011, when Brazil held the rotating presidency of the Council. Viotti was succeeded by Luiz Alberto Figueiredo on 16 January 2013.

At the end of 2015, Viotti was appointed as a future candidate to the post of Secretary-General of the UN. Being a close friend of several Permanent Representatives for decades; having played an important part in assuring the stability and conciliation of political forces in Afghanistan; and having long worked for human rights advances and social development in the poorest countries, she was the Brazilian favourite.

 "As a multidimensional threat, terrorism must be addressed from a holistic approach that takes into consideration the diversity of its underlying causes. Radicalism and violence often stem from longstanding social, political, economic and cultural exclusion, amidst which a culture of intolerance may thrive. Development and inclusiveness are key tools to combat terrorism". 

From 2016, Viotti served as Under-Secretary for Asia and the Pacific at the Brazilian Ministry of Foreign Affairs, where she had special responsibility for work on BRICS.

Career with the United Nations
In December 2016, incoming UN Secretary General António Guterres appointed her as his Chef de Cabinet.

Other activities
 United Nations System Staff College (UNSSC), chair of the board of governors

See also
Brazil and the United Nations
List of Permanent Representatives to the UN

References

External links
Permanent Mission of Brazil to the United Nations

1954 births
Living people
Permanent Representatives of Brazil to the United Nations
Brazilian women ambassadors
Ambassadors of Brazil to Germany
Rio Branco Institute alumni
University of Brasília alumni